Şükrü Sarıışık (born 1945, Konya) is a retired Turkish general. He was Secretary-General of the National Security Council from 2003 to 2004, and then Commander of the Second Army.

Sarıışık was appointed Commander of the Aegean Army in August 2006. He was one of a number of officers retired in August 2007 for "indiscipline".

In 2012 Sarıışık was sentenced to 18 years in prison for his role in the 2003 "Sledgehammer" coup plan.

References

1945 births
People from Konya
Turkish Army generals
Living people
Secretaries General of the National Security Council (Turkey)
Commanders of the Second Army of Turkey